Anthracoceras is the type genus of the goniatitid ammonoid family Anthracoceratidae whose species are found Mississippian-aged limestones in Eurasia, North America and Africa.

References

 The Paleobiology Database accessed on 10/01/07

Pericyclaceae
Goniatitida genera
Ammonites of Europe
Ammonites of Africa
Ammonites of Asia
Ammonites of North America
Carboniferous ammonites